Arsenal Machine-Building Plant is a company based in Saint Petersburg, Russia.

Historically, a major producer of artillery, the Arsenal Production Association also produces a variety of complex mechanical equipment, such as compressor stations, refrigeration and gas equipment, extrusion machines, and satellite platforms. It is collocated with the Arsenal Design Bureau. It is composed of 5 separate administrative entities: two civilian production operations, a military production operation, a technical support facility, and a commercial center.

Products
 100 mm field gun M1944 (BS-3)
 AK-100 (naval gun)
 AK-130
 AK-257
 R-31 (missile)
 RT-2
 SS-14 Scapegoat

References

External links
 Official website

Mechanical engineering companies of Russia
Companies based in Saint Petersburg
Companies formerly listed on the Moscow Exchange
Ministry of the Defense Industry (Soviet Union)
Defence companies of the Soviet Union